Herbert Edward Parkin (born 1908) was a British trade unionist and politician.

Born in Waingroves in Derbyshire, Parkin left school aged fourteen to work at the Hartshay Colliery.  This pit closed in 1931, but he found work at New Langley Colliery.  There, he opposed the introduction of subcontracting, known as the "butty" system, and as a result became active in the Derbyshire Miners' Association (DMA).

In 1937, Parkin was elected as checkweighman at New Langley, and also to the local branch committee of the DMA.  From 1941, he was the pit's delegate to the DMA council.  He also became active in the Labour Party and was elected to Heanor Urban District Council in 1946.  In 1948, he became president of his local DMA branch, and from 1951, he was vice-chair of Heanor UDC.

Parkin was elected as vice-president of the reconstituted Derbyshire Area of the National Union of Mineworkers in 1951.  The following year, the post of president became open, and he won the election, serving until 1966, when he took over as the union's general secretary, serving until his retirement in 1973.

References

1908 births
Year of death missing
Councillors in Derbyshire
English miners
Labour Party (UK) councillors
British trade union leaders